Coahoma High School is a public high school located in Coahoma, Texas (USA).  It is part of the Coahoma Independent School District located in eastern Howard County and classified as a 3A school by the UIL.  As of the summer of 2010, Coahoma High School has just finished work on a brand new school facility that includes new hallways, library, classrooms, and various other improvements.   In 2011, the school was rated "Academically Acceptable" by the Texas Education Agency.

Athletics
The Coahoma Bulldogs compete in cross country, volleyball, football, basketball, powerlifting, tennis, golf, track, rodeo, softball and baseball.

State title
Softball - 
1998 (2A)

State finalists
Softball - 
1996 (2A), 1999 (2A), 2003 (2A), 2006 (2A), 2022 (3A)

References

External links
Coahoma ISD

Schools in Howard County, Texas
Public high schools in Texas